Huntlee is a planned medium-sized township near Branxton in the Hunter Region of New South Wales, Australia. The first stage of construction officially began on 25 February 2014. Land sales in the first village, which is to be called Katherine's Landing, began in late 2013.

Its future was uncertain as the plans for its development had twice been knocked back in the Land and Environment Court of New South Wales. Local environmentalists had protested that development of the site would threaten surviving pockets of the endangered species Persoonia pauciflora. However, the rejection has been overturned in the New South Wales Court of Appeal as of 8 December 2011.

The project plan will initially create up to 5,600 residential dwellings in four distinctive villages, with planned room for population growth. It will also include a 200ha mixed use Town Centre/downtown district catering for a range of retail, commercial, primary and secondary education uses as well as up to 1,700 downtown dwellings.

Additionally, 17ha has been set aside for the Persoonia Park, part of a comprehensive conservation program established by LWP in consultation with the Department of Environment, Climate Change and Water for the propagation and protection of the endangered species Persoonia Pauciflora.

Education
Huntlee will develop multiple educational facilities to cater its population. Establishment of the Huntlee Academy – a not for profit company designed to coordinate the training and employment of local people to be job-ready for any employment opportunities generated by Huntlee. This will enable the Huntlee 'New Town' development to roll-out sustainably, placing local people in local jobs.

Both public and private high schools will be in Huntlee, enabling existing Branxton, Greta and North Rothbury residents the option to avoid travelling to other towns such as Maitland and Newcastle to access high schools.

Environment
Huntlee is branded as a sustainable, green community.  An overall environmentally sustainable development strategy that incorporates environmental and social considerations has been prepared, which includes reducing energy demand, passive solar design, reducing CO² emissions, exploring renewable energy technology, reducing water demand and integration of recycled water into the home and public domain. However, as of 2022 there are currently no energy- or water- saving measures in place, along with no natural shade as all the once-forested land surrounding is being cleared.

References

Further reading
 Concerns over Huntlee community infrastructure - ABC News (Australian Broadcasting Corporation)
 Controversial new $1.5 billion Hunter town gets the go-ahead
 www.smh.com.au - Huntlee housing development | Fresh battles look set for court
 Huntlee housing fight continues – ABC Newcastle NSW – Australian Broadcasting Corporation
 Huntlee opponents confident ahead of court appeal - ABC News (Australian Broadcasting Corporation)
 Huntlee, Catherine Hill Bay concerns in planning changes | Newcastle Herald

External links
 Huntlee.com.au
 Lwppropertygroup.com.au
 Robertsday - Huntlee New Town, nsw
 Huntlee - Plan

City of Cessnock